Isaiah R. Rose (June 26, 1843 – November 26, 1916) was a Republican state senator for Ohio, a Washington County sheriff and a Civil War veteran.

Early life
Rose was born on June 26, 1843, in Belmont County, Ohio.

Civil War
Rose enrolled twice as a soldier for the Union Army. He was captured and transported to Andersonville Prison as a prisoner. He later escaped and returned to his former army. However, he was mistaken for a scout or a Confederate soldier and was shot in the left leg. This injury left him permanently disabled.

Public office 
Rose returned to Ohio and was elected sheriff for Washington County as a member of the Republican Party, and subsequently as a state senator. During his career in the Ohio Senate, he was a champion of the temperance movement in Ohio, introducing ultimately successful legislation allowing individual counties to enact local legislation banning the sale of liquor.

Personal life
Rose was married to Melissa Ellen Crawford and had seven children. He died on November 26, 1916, in Coal Run, Ohio. He is buried in Round Bottom Cemetery in Ohio. His descendants include singer and songwriter Kelly Clarkson.

References

Kelly Clarkson
1843 births
1916 deaths
People from Washington County, Ohio
Republican Party Ohio state senators
People of Ohio in the American Civil War
Union Army soldiers
American Civil War prisoners of war